Afilia oslari is a species of moth in the family Notodontidae (the prominents). It was first described by Harrison Gray Dyar Jr. in 1904 and it is found in North America.

The MONA or Hodges number for Afilia oslari is 7962.

References

Further reading

 
 
 

Notodontidae
Articles created by Qbugbot
Moths described in 1904